Phosphamidon is an organophosphate insecticide first reported in 1960.  It acts as a cholinesterase inhibitor.

The commercial product typically exists as a mixture of 70% (Z)-isomer and 30% (E)-isomer.

Toxicity and regulation
Phosphamidon is very highly toxic to mammals and is listed as WHO Hazard Class Ia. A harvester developed symptoms of moderately severe poisoning after working in a field that had been sprayed with the chemical 2 weeks earlier. He collapsed and exhibited significant depression of serum cholinesterase, but recovered completely within 2 days after successful treatment with atropine. International trade of phosphamidon is covered by the Rotterdam Convention.

References

Acetylcholinesterase inhibitors
Organophosphate insecticides
Carboxamides
Organochlorides
Methyl esters